Sean William Newcomb (born June 12, 1993) is an American professional baseball pitcher in the San Francisco Giants organization. He played college baseball at the University of Hartford. The Los Angeles Angels of Anaheim selected Newcomb in the first round of the 2014 MLB draft, and traded him to the Atlanta Braves in 2015. He made his MLB debut in 2017 with the Braves, and has also played for the Chicago Cubs.

Amateur career
Newcomb attended Middleborough High School in Middleborough, Massachusetts. As a senior, he had a 0.46 earned run average (ERA) with 110 strikeouts in 58 innings pitched.

After high school, Newcomb enrolled at the University of Hartford. As a freshman for the Hartford Hawks baseball team in 2012, Newcomb started nine games before suffering a season-ending injury. His first college win was a no-hitter against Yale. He finished the year with a 2–4 win–loss record with a 4.17 ERA and 45 strikeouts in  innings. As a sophomore in 2013, he started 12 of 13 games, going 5–4 with a 3.75 ERA and 92 strikeouts over 72 innings. In 2012 and 2013, he played collegiate summer baseball with the Wareham Gatemen of the Cape Cod Baseball League. Newcomb started his junior season without allowing a run through his first  innings. He finished the year 8–2 with a 1.25 ERA and 106 strikeouts in  innings. He was named the 2014 America East Pitcher of the Year, becoming the first Hawk to win a major conference award.

Professional career

Los Angeles Angels
Newcomb was considered a top prospect for the 2014 Major League Baseball draft. He was drafted in the first round, 15th overall, by the Los Angeles Angels of Anaheim. He signed with the Angels, receiving a $2,518,000 signing bonus. Newcomb was assigned to the Class A Burlington Bees and later, in 2015, promoted to the Class AA Arkansas Travelers, where he ended his first full season in professional baseball; he had a combined 2.38 ERA across 3 levels. Finishing 2nd in minor league baseball with 168 strikeouts.

Atlanta Braves
On November 12, 2015, the Angels traded Newcomb, Erick Aybar, Chris Ellis, and cash considerations to the Atlanta Braves for Andrelton Simmons and José Briceño. The Braves invited Newcomb to spring training and he spent the 2016 season with the Double A Mississippi Braves. While pitching in the Southern League, he posted 4.6 walks per nine innings with a 3.86 ERA.

Newcomb was invited to spring training for the second time at the start of the 2017 season. He started the season with the Gwinnett Braves of the Class AAA International League. Newcomb pitched to a 2.97 ERA in  innings, alongside 74 strikeouts and 33 walks prior to his first promotion to the major leagues. He made his major league debut on June 10, 2017, for the Braves at SunTrust Park against the New York Mets. He pitched  innings, allowing four hits and one unearned run with seven strikeouts. For the season, he was 4–9 with a 4.32 ERA. On July 29, 2018, Newcomb took a no-hitter through  innings until Chris Taylor singled. The Braves defeated the Los Angeles Dodgers 4–1. After this outing, social media posts Newcomb made to Twitter at the age of eighteen came to light. The comments included homophobic slurs and racial epithets. During the 2018 season, Newcomb tallied an ERA of 3.91, but struggled over his final fourteen starts, recording a 5.50 ERA in that span.

Newcomb started the Braves' first game at SunTrust Park in 2019. He faced the Chicago Cubs, pitching four innings of an 8–0 win. Newcomb completed the seventh inning in his next game against the Miami Marlins, but struggled against the New York Mets, leading to his demotion to the Gwinnett Stripers on April 14. Newcomb returned to the major league club on May 4, and made several relief appearances. He returned to the starting rotation to face the Philadelphia Philles on June 15, 2019. Newcomb was struck in the head by a batted ball from J. T. Realmuto, and left the game. He was subsequently placed on the seven-day injured list. Newcomb was reactivated on June 25, and faced the Chicago Cubs as a reliever that night. 

Newcomb endured an abysmal 2020 season, registering an 11.20 ERA in 13.2 innings pitched across 4 games, striking out 10.

In 2021 with the Braves he was 2–0 with one save and a 4.73 ERA, as in 32 relief appearances he pitched 32.1 innings, walked 27 batters, and struck out 43 batters.The Braves finished with an 88–73 record, clinching the NL East, and eventually won the 2021 World Series, giving the Braves their first title since 1995.

The Braves designated Newcomb for assignment on April 19, 2022.

Chicago Cubs
On April 20, 2022, Newcomb was traded to the Chicago Cubs in exchange for Jesse Chavez and cash considerations. After spending time on the injured list with a left ankle sprain, he was activated on June 13. Newcomb allowed five runs in an inning of work in an 18-4 loss against the New York Yankees and was designated for assignment after the game. On June 20, Newcomb was outrighted to the Triple-A Iowa Cubs. On September 17, Newcomb was once again designated for assignment by the Cubs. He elected free agency on October 6, 2022.

San Francisco Giants
On February 6, 2023, Newcomb signed a minor league contract with the San Francisco Giants organization.

Personal
Newcomb was a fan of the Boston Red Sox growing up.

References

External links

Hartford Hawks bio

1993 births
Living people
People from Middleborough, Massachusetts
Sportspeople from Plymouth County, Massachusetts
Baseball players from Massachusetts
Major League Baseball pitchers
Atlanta Braves players
Chicago Cubs players
Hartford Hawks baseball players
Wareham Gatemen players
Arizona League Angels players
Burlington Bees players
Inland Empire 66ers of San Bernardino players
Arkansas Travelers players
Mississippi Braves players
Gwinnett Braves players
Gwinnett Stripers players